Selby Norton (13 September 1836 – 11 November 1906) was an English doctor who played one first-class cricket match for Kent County Cricket Club. He was born at West Malling in Kent and died in Brixton.

Norton made an appearance in 1860 for the Gentlemen of Kent, but his only first-class appearance came three years later against Nottinghamshire. A doctor by trade, Norton was called up to play in an emergency by his brother South Norton, who was the county captain at the time.

Another brother, Bradbury Norton, and a nephew, Henry Hayman, also played first-class cricket.

References

1836 births
1906 deaths
English cricketers
Kent cricketers
People from West Malling
19th-century English medical doctors